The Filmfare Special Award or Special Performance Award or Special Mention or Special Jury Award is given by the Filmfare magazine as part of its annual Filmfare Awards for Hindi films.

It acknowledges a special and unique performance and encourages artistes, filmmakers and musicians to break new ground in drama, direction, music and acting. It is only given if someone has done something really different. However, it is also given occasionally to film personalities for their contribution to the film industry.

Winners

1970s

1980s

1990s

2000s

2010s

2020s

See also
 Filmfare Awards
 Bollywood
 Cinema of India

References

External links
 Filmfare Nominees and Winners
Filmfare Special Awards 

Special Award